All That "Hip Hop" is an alternative hip hop music compilation album by Warner Music Australia. It is a collection of three CDs containing music from various artists, released in 2005.

Track listing

Disc 1
 Afrika Bambaataa & Soul Sonic Force - "Planet Rock"
 Busta Rhymes - "It's a Party"
 Coolio - "1, 2, 3, 4 (Sumpin' New)"
 Lil' Kim - "The Jump Off"
 Stetsasonic - "Talkin' All That Jazz"
 Fabolous - "Can't Let You Go"
 Ice-T - "You Played Yourself"
 Missy Elliott - "Pass That Dutch"
 Kulcha - "Booty Funk"
 Knoc-Turn'al - "Have Fun"
 Leaders Of The New School - "Case of the P.T.A."
 Nappy Roots - "Awnaw" (featuring Jazze Pha)
 Queen Latifah - "Come Into My House"
 Naughty By Nature - "Everything's Gonna Be Alright"
 Noreaga - "Body In The Trunk" (featuring Nas)

Disc 2
 Missy Elliott - "Work It"
 De La Soul - "Me, Myself And I"
 Fabolous - "Can't Deny It" (featuring Nate Dogg)
 Ice-T - "Colors"
 Busta Rhymes - "Put Your Hands Where My Eyes Could See"
 Capone-N-Noreaga - "Phonetime"
 Nappy Roots - "Kentucky Mud"
 Noreaga - "Superthug"
 Ol' Dirty Bastard - "Proteck Ya Neck II The Zoo"
 Queen Latifah - "Latifah's Law"
 Stetsasonic - "Go Brooklyn 3"
 House of Pain - "Shamrocks And Shenanigans"
 Everlast - "Never Missin' A Beat"
 Kulcha - "Nasty"
 Digital Underground - "The Return Of The Crazy One"

Disc 3
 Coolio - "Too Hot"
 De La Soul - "Potholes in My Lawn"
 Lil' Kim - "Queen B@#$H"
 House of Pain - "Same As It Ever Was"
 Ol' Dirty Bastard - "Brooklyn Zoo"
 Nate Dogg - "I Got Love"
 Queen Latifah & Monie Love - "Ladies First"
 Everlast - "Money (Dollar Bill)" (featuring Sadat X)
 Capone-N-Noreaga - "Invincible"
 K7 - "Come Baby Come"
 Kulcha - "Bring It On"
 RuPaul - "Supermodel (You Better Work)"
 Digital Underground - "Doowutchyalike"
 Naughty By Nature - "Feel Me Flow"
 Da Lench Mob - "Freedom Got An AK"

References

Hip hop compilation albums
2005 compilation albums